Dziewin may refer to the following places in Poland:
Dziewin, Lower Silesian Voivodeship (south-west Poland)
Dziewin, Lesser Poland Voivodeship (south Poland)